Jos Brink (19 June 1942 – 17 August 2007) was a Dutch actor, radio and musical performer, film producer, television and radio personality, columnist and author. Brink was also a pastor engaged to the oecumenical congregation De Duif in Amsterdam.

Brink was born in Heiloo, North Holland. He did much to promote acceptance of homosexuality in Dutch society and was a well-known out gay person. He started living with his artistic partner Frank Sanders in 1973.

In a 1979 TV show Thank You, Your Majesty he kissed Queen Juliana (1909–2004) while congratulating her on her 70th birthday.

Awards 
 Gouden Televizier-Ring for AVRO's Puzzeluur (1979) and for Wedden, dat..? (1986)
 Ridder in de Orde van Oranje-Nassau (1988)
 Eremedaille van Verdienste by the Ministry of Culture in Belgium (1989)
 Frans Banninck Cocq Penning by the Municipality of Amsterdam (2002)

Death
Jos Brink died of colorectal cancer in Amsterdam on 17 August 2007, aged 65.

References

External links
Public reactions on his death 
Dossier Jos Brink of the Dutch National Library 
 

1942 births
2007 deaths
People from Heiloo
Deaths from cancer in the Netherlands
Deaths from colorectal cancer
Dutch male comedians
Dutch cabaret performers
Dutch male musical theatre actors
Dutch television presenters
Dutch male voice actors
Dutch gay actors
Dutch gay musicians
Dutch gay writers
LGBT cabaret performers
LGBT Calvinist and Reformed ministers
Gay comedians
Gay singers
Dutch LGBT rights activists
Dutch LGBT singers
Dutch LGBT comedians
20th-century Dutch male singers
20th-century Dutch comedians
Remonstrants
20th-century Dutch LGBT people
21st-century Dutch LGBT people